Anolis bimaculatus, the panther anole, also known as the St. Eustatius anole or Statia Bank tree anole, is a species of anole lizard that is endemic to the Caribbean Lesser Antilles.  It is found on the St. Kitts Bank of islands, which comprise Saint Kitts, Nevis, and Sint Eustatius.

Males can reach a length of 123 mm snout-to-vent, and their coloration varies somewhat based on size.  The larger males have a bright green to yellow-green dorsal surface that is usually spotted or marbled with gray, brown, or black.  Its ventral surface ranges from dull white to yellow to light green.  Its dewlap is proportionately small for an anole, and is yellow or orange, occasionally with whitish scales.  Females are smaller and duller colored, as are smaller males.

This species is relatively common on Saint Kitts and Nevis, widespread up to around 300 m in elevation.  It coexists throughout its range with A. schwartzi, a much smaller species that also differs in many aspects of its ecology and behavior.

A former subspecies, A. b. leachi, was elevated to species status.

See also
List of Anolis lizards

References

.

External links
Anolis bimaculatus at the Encyclopedia of Life
Anolis bimaculatus at the Reptile Database

B
Lizards of the Caribbean
Fauna of Sint Eustatius
Fauna of Saint Kitts and Nevis
Reptiles described in 1784
Taxa named by Anders Sparrman